The Scalby Formation is a geological formation in England. Part of the Ravenscar Group, it was deposited in the Bathonian stage of the Middle Jurassic. The lower Moor Grit Member has a lithology consisting of medium to coarse grained cross bedded sandstone, with thin beds of mudstone and siltstone, while the upper Long Nab Member has a lithology consisting of predominantly laminated mudstone and siltstone, with fine to medium grained planar and cross stratified sandstones.

Fossilized dinosaur tracks have been found in the Scalby Formation; these include a recently discovered footprint from a large theropod, probably a megalosaurid. The track is from the Long Nab Member, and has been assigned to the ichnogenus Megalosauripus.

References

Bathonian Stage